Mount Mageik  is a stratovolcano on the Alaska Peninsula. It has no confirmed historical eruptions (one in 1946 is now deemed questionable), but its youngest eruptive products are apparently Holocene in age (8750 to 500 BCE).  A young crater lies on the northeast flank of the central summit cone, and is the site of vigorous superheated fumarolic activity with prominent sulfur deposits. The volcanic cones are composed of andesite, basaltic andesite and dacite.

The volcano is mantled in ash from the 1912 eruption of Novarupta and from the 1953 eruption of nearby  Trident Volcano.

See also
 List of volcanoes in the United States

References

External links
 Volcanoes of the Alaska Peninsula and Aleutian Islands-Selected Photographs
 Alaska Volcano Observatory

Stratovolcanoes of the United States
Mountains of Alaska
Volcanoes of Alaska
Aleutian Range
Volcanoes of Kodiak Island Borough, Alaska
Volcanoes of Lake and Peninsula Borough, Alaska
Mountains of Kodiak Island Borough, Alaska
Mountains of Lake and Peninsula Borough, Alaska
Holocene stratovolcanoes
Pleistocene stratovolcanoes